Butler Township is one of the twenty townships of Darke County, Ohio, United States. The 2010 census found 1,535 people in the township, 1,213 of whom lived in the unincorporated portions of the township.

Geography
Located in the southern part of the county, it borders the following townships:
Neave Township - north
Van Buren Township - northeast corner
Twin Township - east
Harrison Township, Preble County - southeast corner
Monroe Township, Preble County - south
Jefferson Township, Preble County - southwest corner
Harrison Township - west
Liberty Township - northwest corner

Two incorporated villages are located in Butler Township: Castine in the southeast, and part of New Madison in the west.  The unincorporated community of Otterbein lies in the township's southwest.

Name and history
Butler Township was established about 1820, and most likely was named after Butler County, Ohio, which had been named for General Richard Butler. It is one of six Butler Townships statewide.

Government
The township is governed by a three-member board of trustees, who are elected in November of odd-numbered years to a four-year term beginning on the following January 1. Two are elected in the year after the presidential election and one is elected in the year before it. There is also an elected township fiscal officer, who serves a four-year term beginning on April 1 of the year after the election, which is held in November of the year before the presidential election. Vacancies in the fiscal officership or on the board of trustees are filled by the remaining trustees.  The current trustees are Thomas Hans, Curtis Yount, and Ryan Crawford, and the clerk is Melissa Sullenbarger.

References

External links
County website

Townships in Darke County, Ohio
Townships in Ohio